This is a list of people from Santa Monica, California.

Jay Adams, skateboarder
Amy Alcott, professional golfer
Britt Allcroft, creator and former producer of Thomas the Tank Engine & Friends television series
Rod Allen, TV color commentator for Detroit Tigers (Fox Sports Detroit)
Tony Alva, skateboarder
Tiffanie Anderson, singer
Tom Anderson, founder of MySpace
Warner Anderson, actor on The Lineup 
Aubrey Anderson-Emmons (born 2007), child actress
Kenneth Anger, filmmaker and author
David Anspaugh, film director
Sean Astin, actor, director, and producer
Don Bachardy, painter and spouse of Christoper Isherwood 
John Baldessari, artist
Frank Edmund Beatty, Jr., U.S. Navy Vice Admiral
Ashley Bell (born 1986), actress
Sean Berry, MLB player for five teams
Carolyn Beug (1952–2011), filmmaker and video producer
Big Sean, rapper 
Jack Black, musician and actor
Steven Blum, voice actor
Judy Blumberg, figure skater, U.S. ice dancing champion
Brennan Boesch, MLB player
Jeff Bollow, author, filmmaker
Ryan Braun, MLB player for the Milwaukee Brewers
Don Burgess (born 1956), cinematographer
Jeanie Buss, Los Angeles Lakers executive
Juan José Carrillo, first mayor of Santa Monica, Los Angeles Police Chief, politician and judge
George Cates, composer and conductor
Geraldine Chaplin, actress
Buff Cobb, actress, television personality
Mike Colbern, baseball player
Don Collier, western film and television actor
Lana Condor, actress
Nichole Cordova, singer
Marcia Cross, actress, Desperate Housewives
Jamie Lee Curtis, actress
Carson Daly, television personality, host of NBC's The Voice and Last Call with Carson Daly
Larry David, actor, screenwriter, producer, Seinfeld, Curb Your Enthusiasm
Scott Davis, tennis player
Cody Decker (born 1987), MLB player
Alexis Denisof, actor
Robert Dollard, first Attorney General of South Dakota
Troy Donahue, actor
Dody Dorn, film and sound editor
Pat Doyle, baseball coach
Elonka Dunin, game developer
Jack Engle, hot rodder and custom camshaft grinder, founder of Engle Cams
Emilio Estevez, actor and director
Dwight Evans, MLB player
Shelley Fabares, actress and singer
Joud Fahmy, Saudi Arabian judoka
Ed Fallon, Iowa politician
Miguel Ferrer, actor
Bobbi Fiedler, congresswoman
Kai Forbath, NFL kicker
Bonnie Franklin, actress, One Day at a Time
Max Fried, MLB player for the Atlanta Braves
Lynette Fromme, criminal
John Frusciante, musician, guitarist for Red Hot Chili Peppers
Helen K. Garber, photographer
Mick Garris (born 1951), filmmaker and screenwriter
Frank Gehry, architect
Frank Gifford, football player and sportscaster
Sara Gilbert, actress and television personality
Dan Gilroy, screenwriter and director
Justin Gimelstob, tennis player and commentator
Helen Golay, convicted murderer
Adam Goldberg, actor
Ben Gottschalk (born 1992), NFL football player
Elizabeth Glaser, deceased wife of actor Paul Glaser
Carole Caldwell Graebner, tennis player
Jennifer Grant, actress and writer
Linda Gray (born 1940), film, stage and television actress
Brian Grazer, Oscar-winning film and television producer
Bob Gunton (born 1945), actor
Paul Haggis, Oscar-winning screenwriter
Alyson Hannigan, actress
Mariska Hargitay, actress
Dan Harrington, poker player
Horace Heidt, 1940s bandleader
Julie Heldman (born 1945), tennis player, ranked # 5 in the world
Christy Hemme, professional wrestler for Total Nonstop Action Wrestling
Derek Hill, racing driver
Darby Hinton, actor
Jason Hirsh, baseball player
Peter Hobbs, actor
Tony Horton, fitness guru
Brian Horwitz, MLB outfielder for the San Francisco Giants
Anjelica Huston, Oscar-winning actress 
Christopher Isherwood, author and spouse of Don Bachardy
Anita Kanter (born 1933), tennis player ranked in World top 10
Tommy Kendall, NASCAR driver
Cory Kennedy, It girl, fashion model
Riley Keough, actress
Apollonia Kotero, actress, model, dancer, and singer
Lorenzo Lamas, actor
Andrew Lauer, actor
Christopher Lawford, actor and author
Tim Leary, former MLB player
Jun Hee Lee, actor
June Lockhart, actress
Mark Loretta, MLB player
Kevin Love, NBA player for Cleveland Cavaliers
Torey Lovullo, Boston Red Sox coach
Lorna Luft, entertainer
Dayton Lummis, actor
Tobey Maguire, actor
Stephen Malkmus, musician
Jenna Marbles, comedian
Teena Marie, singer, songwriter, and producer
Eli Marienthal, actor (American Pie 1 and 2, The Iron Giant, Confessions of a Teenage Drama Queen)
Dave Markey, filmmaker and musician
Dean Paul Martin, musician and actor
Chris Masters, professional wrestler
Benjamin McKenzie, actor
Natalie Mejia, singer
Kevin Millar, MLB player
Rick Monday, MLB player and Dodgers radio broadcaster
Coco Montoya, blues guitarist, formerly with John Mayall's Bluesbreakers
Gussie Moran, tennis player
Jon Moscot, American-Israeli MLB player for the Cincinnati Reds
John Forbes Nash, Jr., Nobel prize recipient, arrested when lived here, subject of A Beautiful Mind
Gunnar Nelson, musician
Tracy Nelson, actress
Michael Nozik, filmmaker
Parry O'Brien, two-time Olympic shot put gold medalist
Susan Olsen, actress
Douglas F. O'Neill, thoroughbred horse trainer 
Alan Pasqua, jazz musician
Aaron Paul, actor
Chris Penn, actor
Sean Penn, Oscar-winning actor and director
Rob Picciolo, MLB player for the Milwaukee Brewers, California Angels, and Oakland Athletics
Tyler Posey, actor
Joshua Prager, physician, leader in field of neuromodulation and Complex Regional Pain Syndrome (CRPS)
Robert Redford, actor, director, producer, philanthropist
Randy Rhoads, musician, guitarist for Ozzy Osbourne
Christina Ricci, actress
Ashley Roberts, singer
Brittney Rogers, Miss Louisiana USA 2003
Erin Sanders, actress
Chrystina Sayers, singer
Lawrence Scarpa, architect
Nicole Scherzinger, singer
June Schofield, All-American Girls Professional Baseball League player
Mike Scott, MLB pitcher, Cy Young Award winner
Sandra Seacat, actor and acting coach
Roxanne Seeman, songwriter, record producer, theatre producer
E. C. Segar, cartoonist, creator of Popeye
Frank Shamrock, mixed martial artist
Charlie Sheen, actor
Bobby Sherman, singer and actor
Bobby Shriver, attorney and politician
Cole and Dylan Sprouse, actors
Martin Starr, actor
Neil Strauss, writer and journalist
Gloria Stuart, actress and artist
Jessica Sutta, singer
Amber Tamblyn, actress
Shirley Temple, iconic actress and diplomat
Melody Thornton, singer
Robert Trujillo, musician, Metallica bassist
Amber Valletta, model
Leonor Varela, actress and model
Suzanne Vega, songwriter and singer
Wolfgang Van Halen, rock bassist, son of Eddie Van Halen and nephew of Alex Van Halen
Jack Webb, actor, producer and director
James L. White, screenwriter (Ray)
Joseph Williams, singer and film score composer
Anna May Wong, actor
Vanness Wu, actor, singer, band member of F4
Trifun Zivanovic, figure skater

References

Santa Monica

Santa Monica